Justice's debut album, †, was nominated for a Grammy Award for "Best Electronic/Dance Album" and it was also nominated for the 2007 Shortlist Prize, but lost to The Reminder by Feist. The duo has been successful at the MTV Europe Music Awards, winning three awards: "Best Video" for "We Are Your Friends" in 2006 and "D.A.N.C.E." in 2007, and "Best French Act" for the band, also in 2007. Their remix of the MGMT song "Electric Feel" won the Grammy Award for Best Remixed Recording, Non-Classical in 2009. Overall, Justice has received six awards from fifteen nominations.

Antville Music Video Awards
The Antville Music Video Awards are online awards for the best music video and music video directors of the year. They were first awarded in 2005. Justice has received two awards from nine nominations.

|-
| 2006
| "We Are Your Friends"
| Most Fun Video 
| 
|-
| 2007
| "D.A.N.C.E."
| Best Animated Video
| 
|-
| rowspan="4" | 2008
| rowspan="3" | "Stress"
| Best Editing 
| 
|-
| Best Cinematography
| 
|-
| Video of the Year
| 
|-
| "DVNO"
| rowspan="2"| Best Animated Video
| 
|-
| 2011
| "Civilization"
| 
|-
| rowspan="2" | 2012
| "New Lands"
| Best Visual Effects
| 
|-
| Themselves 
| Best Commissioning Artist
|

Electronic Music Awards
 
|-
| 2017
| Woman
| Album of the Year 
|

Grammy Awards
The Grammy Awards are awarded annually by the National Academy of Recording Arts and Sciences of the United States.

|-
|rowspan="3"|  ||rowspan="2"| "D.A.N.C.E." || Best Short Form Music Video || 
|-
| Best Dance Recording || 
|-
| † || Best Electronic/Dance Album || 
|-
||  || "Electric Feel (Justice Remix)" || Best Remixed Recording, Non-Classical|| 
|-
||  || Woman Worldwide || Best Dance/Electronic Album||

International Dance Music Awards
The International Dance Music Award was established in 1985. It is a part of the Winter Music Conference, a weeklong electronic music event held annually.

 
|-
| rowspan="3" | 2008
| Themselves 
| Best Breakthrough Artist (Group) 
|  
|-
| rowspan="2" | "D.A.N.C.E."
| Best Dance Music Video
|  
|-
| Best Alternative/Rock Dance Track
|

MTV Europe Music Awards
The MTV Europe Music Awards is an annual awards ceremony established in 1994 by MTV Europe.

|-
| 2006 || "We Are Your Friends" || Best Video || 
|-
|rowspan="2"| 2007 || "D.A.N.C.E." || Best Video || 
|-
| Justice || Best French Act || 
|-
| 2011 || "Civilization" || Best Video ||

MTV Video Music Awards
The MTV Video Music Awards is an annual awards ceremony established in 1984 by MTV.

|-
|  || "D.A.N.C.E." || Video of the Year ||

NME Awards
The NME Awards are an annual music awards show founded by the music magazine NME. Justice received one awards from three nominations.

|-
| style="text-align:left;"|2008
| "D.A.N.C.E."
| Best Alternative / Indie Music Video
|
|-
| rowspan="2" | 2012
| Themselves 
| Best International Band
|
|-
| "Civilization"
| Best Dancefloor Anthem 
|

NRJ Music Awards
The NRJ Music Awards is an annual French awards ceremony created by the NRJ radio station and the TF1 television network.

|-
|rowspan="2"| 2008 || Justice || Best New Artist || 
|-
| "D.A.N.C.E." || Best Video ||

Shortlist Music Prize
The Shortlist Music Prize is a music award given annually to an album released in the United States within the last year.

|-
| 2007 || † || Shortlist Music Prize ||

Victoires de la Musique
The Victoires de la Musique is an annual French award ceremony.

|-
|rowspan="2"| 2008 || Justice || Best Electronic/Dance Act || 
|-
| "D.A.N.C.E." || Best Video || 
|-
|rowspan="2"| 2012 || Audio Video Disco || Album de musiques électroniques ||

UK Video Music Awards

|-
| style="text-align:left;"|2008
| "Stress"
| rowspan="2" | Best International Video
|
|-
| style="text-align:left;"|2010
| "Let Love Rule (feat. Lenny Kravitz)"
|
|-
| rowspan="3" | 2011
| rowspan="3"  |"Civilization"
| Best Pop Video - International
|
|-
| Best Art Direction & Design
|
|-
| Best Visual Effects 
|
|-
| rowspan="6" | 2012
| rowspan="4" | "New Lands"
| Best Visual Effects 
|
|-
| Best Editing 
|
|-
| Best Telecine
|
|-
| rowspan="2" | Best Dance Video - International 
|
|-
| "Audio, Video, Disco."
|
|-
| "On'n'On"
| Best Pop Video - International
|

Žebřík Music Awards

!Ref.
|-
| rowspan=2|2007
| Themselves
| Best International Discovery
| 
| rowspan=2|
|-
| "D.A.N.C.E."
| Best International Video
|

References

Justice
Awards